Live and Loud!! Volume 2 is a second live album by the punk rock band Sham 69, recorded in 1977-1979 and released in 1988 (see 1988 in music).

Track listing 
"What Have We Got" - 3:36
"I Don't Wanna" - 1:52
"Rip Off" - 1:40
"Angels with Dirty Faces" - 2:35
"Everybody's Innocent" - 2:33
"Ulster" - 2:51
"They Don't Understand" - 1:42
"Hurry Up Harry" - 3:53
"Voices"
"Who Gives a Damn" - 3:22
"Daytripper" - 3:41
"Borstal Breakout" - 2:12
"Hersham Boys" - 3:25
"If the Kids Are United - 3:14

References 

Sham 69 live albums
1988 live albums